Gornji Breg (Горњи Брег) is a small geographical region in Serbia. It is located in north-eastern Bačka, in the Vojvodina province. There is also a village named Gornji Breg, which is situated in this region.

See also
Bačka
Vojvodina

Geographical regions of Serbia
Geography of Vojvodina
Bačka